Torregrotta (Sicilian: Turri) is a small town and municipality (comune) in the Metropolitan City of Messina in the Italian region Sicily, located about  east of Palermo and about  west of Messina.

It is the twelfth most populous municipality in the Metropolitan City and the most densely populated.

The urban area, located at 44 m a.s.l. in the Niceto valley, it stretches between the Tyrrhenian Sea and the first Peloritani mountains.

Originally built in medieval times as a farmhouse of the Santa Maria della Scala fief, it was rebuilt since 1526 after a period of neglect. At the beginning of the 19th century, it became a sub-municipality of Roccavaldina from which it obtained administrative autonomy in 1923. The sixteenth-century nucleus extended above all since the second half of the nineteenth century.

Center historically linked to agriculture, origin place of sbergia, Torregrotta has lost the traditional agricultural vocation in favor of tertiary sector. Clay extraction and transformation industry had a certain impulse in the twentieth century, almost completely ending in the 2000s. Medium and small craft enterprises prevail.

Transport
Torregrotta is served by the Torregrotta railway station which has regular connections to Palermo, Messina and to the main towns of the northern coast of Sicily. Services are provided by Trenitalia.

Monuments
The traces of Torregrotta's architectural and artistic past are very few but significant: in via Mezzasalma you can still see the only remaining crenellated portal of the ancient Castrum dating back to the sixteenth century.
Interesting traces of the original settlement can be found enclosed in the area around Via Trieste, where the remains of the ancient Castrum tower and houses from periods between the fourteenth and nineteenth centuries still exist.
Incorporated among the ruins of an eighteenth-century house are the remains of a church which, due to its architectural style, can be traced back to the 1300s.
Another interesting trace, especially for its historical value, is the stone icons depicting the Madonna della Scala, which had the function of marking the boundaries of the fief. Those that remain in the municipal area are located in via dei Mille and in the district of Largari.
Equally important from a historical point of view is the painting preserved in the church of S. Paolino depicting the deposition of Christ from the Cross, a canvas dating back to 1671, commissioned by the priest Don Nicolò Bitto (depicted in the right corner, below) to adorn the church of Maria SS. Della Pietà, no longer existing today.
Finally, the war memorial, recognition of the Torresi towards the martyrs of the battlefields, which was the first to be inaugurated in Sicily in September 1919.

References

External links
Official website

Cities and towns in Sicily